Paul Daniel "Ace" Frehley (born April 27, 1951) is an American musician, best known as the original lead guitarist and co-founding member of the hard rock band Kiss. He invented the persona of The Spaceman (a.k.a. Space Ace) and played with the group from its inception in 1973 until his departure in 1982. After leaving Kiss, Frehley formed his own band named Frehley's Comet and released two albums with this group. He subsequently embarked on a solo career, which was put on hold when he rejoined Kiss in 1996 for a highly successful reunion tour. 

Frehley's second tenure with Kiss lasted until 2002, when he left at the conclusion of what was originally purported to be the band's farewell tour. His most recent solo album, Origins Vol. 2, was released on September 18, 2020. Guitar World magazine ranked him as the 14th Greatest Metal Guitarist of All Time. Outside Kiss, Frehley had  commercial success, with his first solo album going platinum.  His first album with his "Frehley's Comet" band was also a big seller. Frehley is noted for his aggressive, atmospheric and melodic guitar playing and is also known for the use of many "special effects" guitars, including a Gibson Les Paul guitar that emits smoke from the neck humbucker pickup and produces spinning pyrotechnics, and a custom Les Paul that emits light based on song tempo. Frehley was inducted into the Rock and Roll Hall of Fame in 2014 as a member of Kiss.

Early life
Paul Daniel Frehley was born and raised in The Bronx, New York City, the youngest of three children of Esther Anna (Hecht) (1920-2006) and Carl Daniel Frehley (1903-2000). His father, from Pennsylvania, was the son of Dutch immigrants, and his mother is originally from North Carolina. He has a sister, Nancy, and a brother, Charles, a classical guitarist. The Frehleys were a musical family, and when Frehley received an electric guitar as a Christmas present in 1964, he immersed himself in learning the instrument. "I never went to music school; I never took a guitar lesson, but everybody in my family plays an instrument. My mother and father both played piano, his father was the church organist, and my brother and sister both played piano and acoustic guitar." Frehley was always surrounded by music, and started playing guitar at age 13. He lists Jimi Hendrix, Albert Lee, Buddy Guy, Jeff Beck, B.B. King, Led Zeppelin, The Rolling Stones, and The Who as his main influences.

Growing up on the corner of Marion Avenue and 201st Street, off Bedford Park Boulevard (also known as 200th Street) and Webster Avenue in the Bedford Park section of the Bronx, Frehley graduated from Grace Lutheran School at age 13. Two of the high schools he attended were DeWitt Clinton High School on Mosholu Parkway and Theodore Roosevelt High School on Fordham Road. He got the nickname "Ace" in high school from friends who said he was "a real ace" for his ability to get dates. Also in his high school years, a guidance counselor encouraged him to get into graphic arts. He later credited guitar playing for "saving his life" as a member of Kiss.

Music career

Early career
Frehley's earliest bands included The Outrage, The Four Roses, King Kong, Honey, and The Magic People. When Frehley's later band, Cathedral, began getting paying gigs, he dropped out of high school. At the insistence of his family and girlfriend, Frehley eventually returned and earned a diploma. After graduation, Frehley held a string of short-term jobs, including mail carrier, furniture deliverer, messenger, taxi driver and liquor store delivery person.

Kiss

Frehley spent the early 1970s in a series of local bands including one called Molimo who recorded half an album for RCA Records in 1971. In late 1972, his friend, Chris Cassone, spotted an advertisement for a lead guitarist in The Village Voice and showed the ad to Frehley. Frehley went to 10 East 23rd Street above the Live Bait Bar and auditioned for Paul Stanley (rhythm guitar), Gene Simmons (bass guitar), and Peter Criss (drums). Frehley showed up wearing one red and one orange sneaker and was less than impressive visually, but the band liked what they heard from his playing. About three weeks later the band named Frehley as their lead guitarist. By January 1973 the band came up with the name Kiss. Frehley designed the band's double-lightning-bolt logo, which was polished up by Stanley. The band quickly decided to paint their faces for live performances and Frehley decided to start painting silver stars on his eyes. When the group eventually decided to adopt stage personas to match their makeup and costumes, Frehley became Space Ace. Later his stage persona was also known as The Spaceman.

While Kiss spent their early days rehearsing and playing in empty clubs, Frehley worked as a part-time cab driver to pay bills. In September 1973, Kiss members began to receive a $50 a week salary from new manager Bill Aucoin, and Frehley quit his cabbie job.

Kiss released their debut album, Kiss, in February 1974 – Frehley was credited for writing two songs, "Love Theme from KISS" (the only song co-written by the four original members) and a fan classic, "Cold Gin". Due to Frehley's lack of confidence in his own singing voice, however, Simmons performed the vocals. Frehley wrote or co-wrote several of the band's songs over the next few years but did not record vocals on a song until "Shock Me" (inspired by his near-electrocution during a concert in Lakeland, Florida), which appeared on 1977's Love Gun.

As lead guitarist, Frehley was known for his frenetic, atmospheric playing, becoming one of the most popular guitarists in the 1970s and spawning a generation of new players. Frehley stated in the book Kiss: Behind the Mask that many guitarists have told him his playing on 1975's hit Alive! prompted them to pick up the instrument. Frehley is well-recognized for using Gibson Les Paul guitars, including his trademarked model conversion Les Paul Custom (that was designed and implemented by John Elder Robison, known as "Ampie", an audio engineer working with the band), which filled the stage full of smoke during his live guitar solo.

Along with the three other Kiss members, Frehley released an eponymous solo album in 1978. His was the bestselling of the four, and the album's lone single—the Russ Ballard-written "New York Groove", originally recorded by Hello—reached the Top 20 in the United States.

Frehley's songwriting presence within the group increased in 1979. He contributed three songs for 1979's Dynasty and three for 1980's Unmasked. While this was not the most commercially successful time for Kiss in the United States, the band was beginning to take off in other countries (mostly in Australia, where Dynasty and Unmasked are their biggest-selling albums). Even as his songwriting role within Kiss was increasing, Frehley found himself increasingly at odds with the musical direction of the band. After Peter Criss was voted out of Kiss in 1980, Frehley was often outvoted 2–1 in band decisions, as replacement drummer Eric Carr was not a partner in Kiss and had no vote. Frehley's participation in the recording of 1981's Music from "The Elder" was far more limited than with previous albums. This was in large part due to his unhappiness with the band's decision to create a concept album rather than a straightforward rock album, and also, by Frehley's own admission, his "not relating all that well" to producer Bob Ezrin, who cut many of Frehley's solos from the recorded tracks.

Although Frehley appeared on the covers for 1982's greatest hits album Killers and studio album Creatures of the Night, he had no involvement with Killers, and minimal (no musical) input on Creatures of the Night. Frehley's last appearances with the band were the video for "I Love It Loud", a series of European promotional appearances in November 1982 and a band interview with MTV promoting their world tour.

Solo career/Frehley's Comet
In December 1982, Kiss began the Creatures of the Night tour without Frehley: he was replaced by Vinnie Vincent. Frehley retained a one-quarter share in the Kiss partnership until 1985, however. He received one-quarter of the profits for both Lick It Up and Animalize although he had no involvement with either record.

In 1984, Frehley started his post-Kiss solo career by assembling a band that included, among others, drummer Anton Fig (who had performed on Frehley's 1978 solo album and on two Kiss albums). Bassist John Regan (who had worked with Peter Frampton), whom Frehley met in 1980, was also an original member of the band as was vocalist/guitarist Richie Scarlet and keyboardist Arthur Stead.  The group, whose name alternated between 'Ace Frehley' and Frehley's Comet, recorded a series of demos throughout 1984 and 1985.  The band performed their first ever live show at S.I.R. Studios in New York City on November 30, 1984, and played a handful of shows in the Northeast United States in March 1985.

After a few unsuccessful attempts at securing a recording contract, the group eventually signed to Megaforce Records and released their first album, Frehley's Comet, on July 7, 1987. The album was co-produced by Eddie Kramer, who had produced not only a number of Kiss albums, but Frehley's 1978 album and some of his 1984–85 demos. Fig, now being the in-studio drummer for David Letterman's late-night television show, performed on the album but was unable to maintain a permanent commitment to touring. He played on the 1987 tour in the United States when Frehley's band played a double bill with Y&T, and White Lion opening the shows. By the time the band began recording this album, Scarlet had left the group to pursue other projects and was replaced by Tod Howarth. In addition, at some point between the initial Frehley's Comet shows in 1984–85 and their signing to Megaforce, the band had become a four-piece, with Stead no longer playing with the group.

Frehley's Comet, a mixture of hard rock and pop metal, was a successful return to the music scene for Frehley. The album peaked at No. 43 on the Billboard 200 (selling nearly 500,000 copies), and the single, a Russ Ballard cover "Into the Night", reached No. 27 on the Mainstream Rock Tracks chart. "Rock Soldiers" was an autobiographic song, written partially about Frehley's April 1982 police chase in White Plains, NY while driving a DeLorean with his friend. The video for "Rock Soldiers" received moderate airplay on MTV, particularly on Headbangers Ball.

Despite the positive reviews and healthy album sales of Frehley's Comet, Frehley was unable to maintain much commercial momentum. Two 1988 Frehley's Comet albums—the live EP Live+1 and second studio album Second Sighting peaked at No. 84 and No. 81, respectively. A pair of tours in support of Alice Cooper and Iron Maiden ended prematurely, with the band claiming lack of payment in both cases.

In order to reverse his band's declining commercial fortunes, Frehley dropped the Frehley's Comet moniker and issued 1989's Trouble Walkin' under his own name. Tod Howarth and Jamie Oldaker also decided to leave before recording started on the album, and were replaced by Scarlet and Sandy Slavin. Despite the return to a more traditional hard rock style, Trouble Walkin''' continued the pattern of declining sales, and peaked at #102. After the tour for Trouble Walkin' ended prematurely with John Regan resigning after an April 1990 show in Las Vegas, Frehley didn't perform live for two years, until July 1992.

One notable aspect of Trouble Walkin was the guest appearance of Peter Criss, who provided backing vocals on several tracks, along with Sebastian Bach and other members of Skid Row. It was the first time Criss and Frehley had performed together on an album since Kiss' 1979 album, Dynasty, although Criss had shown up briefly at a Frehley's Comet show in Los Angeles in 1987, playing drums on a final encore of "Deuce". Frehley would return the favor by playing solos on Peter Criss' Cat #1 album on TNT Records, released in 1994. In contrast to the somewhat adversarial relationship Frehley had with Kiss (particularly Gene Simmons) throughout the 1980s, he and Criss had maintained good ties during the decade. In June 1995, Frehley's and Criss' bands embarked on the "Bad Boys Tour" with Scarlet on guitar, marking the end of Frehley's solo band for several years as Kiss shortly thereafter reunited and began touring together again.

Reunion with Kiss
In 1996, Frehley rejoined Kiss for a successful reunion tour, on which all four original members of the band performed live for the first time since original drummer Peter Criss' departure in 1980. After the tour, they announced that the original lineup would return to the studio to record a new album. The resulting record, Psycho Circus, was promoted with a successful world tour, but it was revealed a couple of years later that Frehley's and Criss's involvement on it was minimal. "Into the Void", which was Frehley's lone contribution to the record, including vocals and lead guitar duties, is believed to be the only track that all four original members performed on. After completing the "Farewell Tour" with Kiss in late 2001, Frehley left the band and resumed his solo career. In October 2018, he reunited with Kiss on the Kiss Kruise.

Autobiography
Ace Frehley released his autobiography, No Regrets – A Rock 'N' Roll Memoir, on November 1, 2011. The autobiography was authored by Frehley, Joe Layden and John Ostrosky, and published through Gallery Books, a subdivision of Simon & Schuster. The book entered The New York Times Best Seller list in the hardcover non-fiction category at #10.

Technique
In a 2009 interview with Rock N Roll Experience Magazine, Frehley stated, "I'm an anomaly, I'm an un-schooled musician, I don't know how to read music, but I'm one of the most famous guitar players in the world, so go figure."

"I play guitar in such an unorthodox way," he told Guitar World in 1996. "I've never taken a guitar lesson. One of our assistants brought it to my attention a few months ago that, sometimes, when I play chords, my thumb is on the fretted side of the neck. I have no idea why or how I do it, but I do." Paul Stanley added, "I remember a time early on when Ace and I would play, and I would do vibrato with my hand, and Ace would get vibrato by shaking his whole arm against the neck of the guitar [laughs]."

Discography

Solo
 Ace Frehley (1978)
 Frehley's Comet (1987)
 Second Sighting (1988)
 Trouble Walkin' (1989)
 Anomaly (2009)
 Space Invader (2014)
 Origins Vol. 1 (2016)
 Spaceman (2018)
 Origins Vol. 2 (2020)

 Live 
Live+1 (1988)
Greatest Hits Live (2006)

 Compilation albums 
12 Picks (1997)
Loaded Deck (1998)

with Kiss

Kiss (1974)
Hotter Than Hell (1974)
Dressed to Kill (1975)
Destroyer (1976)
Rock and Roll Over (1976)
Love Gun (1977)
Dynasty (1979)
Unmasked (1980)
Music from "The Elder" (1981)
Psycho Circus (1998)Live'Alive (1975)Alive II (1977)Kiss Unplugged (1996)You Wanted the Best, You Got the Best!! (1996)Alive! The Millennium Concert (2006)

Solo singles
 1978: "New York Groove" – from the album Ace Frehley, his 1978 Kiss solo album. This is a cover of a song written by Russ Ballard, which was recorded by the band Hello, for their album Keeps Us off the Streets, released in 1976.
 1987: "Into the Night" – from the album Frehley's Comet.
 1987: "Rock Soldiers" – from the album Frehley's Comet.
 1988: "Words Are Not Enough" – (from the album Live+1).
 1988: "Insane" – from the album Second Sighting.
 1988: "It's Over Now" – from the album Second Sighting.
 1989: "Do Ya" – from the album Trouble Walkin'. A cover of a Jeff Lynne song, written in 1971 whilst in The Move. The song was later recorded with Jeff Lynne's ELO, and included on their album A New World Record, released in 1976.
 2009: "Outer Space" – from the album Anomaly.
 2014: "Gimme a Feelin'" – from the album Space Invader.
 2014: "The Joker" – from the album Space Invader. A cover of the Steve Miller song from his 1973 album The Joker.
 2016: "White Room" – from the album Origins Vol. 1. A cover of the Cream song from their 1968 album Wheels of Fire.
 2016: "Fire and Water" – from the album Origins Vol. 1. A cover of the Free song from their 1970 album, Fire and Water, featuring Paul Stanley of Kiss on vocals (promotional video).
 2018: "Bronx Boy" – from the album Spaceman (released as a single on April 27, 2018, Ace Frehley's birthday).
 2018: "Rockin' with the Boys" – from the album Spaceman. Released October 15, 2018 (promotional video).
 2019: "Mission to Mars" – from the album Spaceman. Released May 28, 2019, with animated YouTube video.
 2020: "Space Truckin'" – from the album Origins Vol. 2. A cover of the Deep Purple song. Released July 28, 2020, with animated YouTube video.
 2020: "I'm Down" – from the album Origins Vol. 2. Released as a Visualizer on YouTube on September 3, 2020. The song "I'm Down" was originally recorded by the Beatles and was the B-side of their 1965 single "Help!".

Guest appearances
 "Eugene" – song on the 1981 self-titled album by Crazy Joe and the Variable Speed Band. Frehley co-wrote and co-produced the song with Joe Renda and played synth drums.
 "Bump and Grind" –  song on the 1984 Wendy O. Williams album WOW, Frehley played lead guitar.
 "Bad Attitude", "Walk the Line", and "Blue Moon Over Brooklyn". Frehley played lead guitar on these three songs that feature on his former Kiss bandmate Peter Criss' album Cat #1 – the 1994 Criss album.
 "Cherokee Boogie" – song on the 1996 compilation album Smell the Fuzz: Guitars that Rule the World 2. The song was written, produced and engineered by Frehley, who also played all guitars on it.
 "Rocker Room Theme" – song on the 1998 Still Wicked album Something Wicked This Way Comes. Frehley played rhythm and lead guitar. CD also features Ron Leejack (Wicked Lester), Gordon G.G. Gebert, MaryAnn Scandiffio and Michael Sciotto.
 "Foxy Lady" – song on the 1998 ESP (Eric Singer Project) album Lost and Spaced. Frehley played lead guitar.
 "Freedom" – song on the 2000 Karl Cochran album Voodooland. Frehley played the guitar solo on the bonus demo version.Insanity of Life – on the 2002 Richie Scarlet album, Frehley played guitar on "Johnny's in Love" and lead guitar on "Too Far Gone", which he co-wrote with Scarlet.
 "Know Where You Go" – On the 2002 Anton Fig album Figments, Frehley played lead guitar.
 "Bad Choice" – on the 2005 Kathy Valentine album Light Years, Frehley played the lead guitar solos.
 "2,000 Man" (new version) – In 2005, Frehley played this new version on Eddie Trunk's Merry Kissmas special. Chris Cassone on acoustic guitar and harmony vocals. Chris suggested the song to Frehley for the Dynasty LP and recorded the demo at North Lake Sound.
 "God of Thunder" (live version) – In 2006, Frehley was a guest at the VH1 Rock Honors. He performed with a 'super-group' of Rob Zombie, Slash, Gilby Clarke, Scott Ian, and Tommy Lee. They performed the KISS song "God of Thunder".
 "Black Diamond" (live version) – On June 25, 2008, Frehley appeared onstage at New York's Madison Square Garden with Pearl Jam for an encore performance of Kiss's "Black Diamond" sung by drummer Matt Cameron.
 "The Ride" – August 12, 2008 Black Pain Society by Jam Pain Society. Frehley played lead guitar on the song.
 "Highway to Hell" (live version) – On July 21, 2009, Frehley appeared on the Dark Horse Tour with members from each of the tour's participating bands in a rendition of AC/DC's "Highway to Hell". Frehley played lead guitar with Chad Kroeger of Nickelback on rhythm guitar and backing vocals—and Austin Winkler of Hinder and Jacoby Shaddix of Papa Roach sharing lead vocals.
 "Nothin' but a Good Time" – Frehley played lead guitar on a re-recorded version of this song, which features on Bret Michaels' 2013 album Jammin' With Friends. The song was originally recorded and released as a single by the rock band Poison.
 "Never Too Hot" – Ace recorded the lead for old friend, Chris Cassone, for his BBQ All Stars CD.
 "Rise Up (Back from the Grave)" – This is a collaboration between Kris Randall and Ace Frehley released in 2014. Written by Ace Frehley and Kris Randall. Co-produced by Kris Randall and Andy Bigan. Guitars/background vocals, Ace Frehley. Vocals/guitar/bass, Kris Randall; drums/bass, Andy Bigan.
 "Starman" – Ace Frehley played lead guitar on Joe Silva's cover of the David Bowie song, released in 2014. The recording also featured Anton Fig on drums and Will Lee on bass, both of whom featured on the Ace Frehley 1978 KISS solo album.

Filmography
 1978: Kiss Meets the Phantom of the Park 1988: Frehley's Comet: Live + 4 (VHS)
 1992: X-treme Close-Up 1994: Ace Frehley – Acevision Volume #1 1996: Kiss Unplugged 1998: Kiss: The Second Coming Documentary 1999: Detroit Rock City2001: Family Guy: A Very Special Family Guy Freakin' Christmas 2004: Kiss Loves You 2005: Remedy 2006: Kissology Volume One: 1974-1977 2007: Kissology Volume Two: 1978-1991 2007: Kissology Volume Three: 1992-2000 2009: Let's Go Cobo (Documentary)

Interviews
 Behind the Player: Ace Frehley DVD'' (2010)
 A Conversation with Ace Frehley on The Pods & Sods Network EM25 – Ace Frehley

References

Sources
 Giles, Jeff (July 10, 2014) "Ace Frehley Reveals 'Space Invader' Track Listing". Ultimate Classic Rock.
 Grow, Kory (May 29, 2014) Rolling Stone Magazine.

Further reading

External links

 
 Career Retrospective Interview from April 2016 with Pods & Sods
 

followed by Mark St. John

Kiss (band) members
American heavy metal guitarists
American rock guitarists
American male guitarists
American rock songwriters
American male songwriters
Lead guitarists
People from the Bronx
Musicians from the Bronx
1951 births
Living people
American people of Dutch descent
American Lutherans
Guitarists from New York City
DeWitt Clinton High School alumni
20th-century American guitarists
Frehley's Comet members
Musicians with fictional stage personas